Sir William Speight Carrington (20 February 1904 – 6 May 1975) was an English accountant.

The son of William Carrington (died 1962) of Blackpool, he was schooled at Hebden Bridge in Yorkshire and then Manchester Grammar School. He qualified as a chartered accountant in 1926 and joined Whinney, Smith and Whinney of London in 1928, becoming a partner in 1932. He was a senior partner of its successor, Whinney Murray and Co. from 1967 to 1970. He was elected a member of the Institute of Chartered Accountants in England and Wales's council in 1942, sitting until 1968; he was the Institute's President for the year 1955–56. He was also a member of the Central Valuation Board under the Coal Nationalisation Act 1946, a Member of the Tucker Committees on taxation of trading profits, a Member of the Royal Commission on Taxation from 1951 to 1955 and a Younger Brother of Trinity House in 1952. He was knighted in 1958. In 1932, he married Dorothy Mary, daughter of T. W. Fabian, and they had one son.

References 

1904 births
1975 deaths
English accountants
Knights Bachelor
20th-century English businesspeople
Members of Trinity House